Lelli is an Italian surname. Notable people with the surname include:

Ercole Lelli (1702–1766), Italian painter
Giovan Battista Lelli (1828–1898), Italian painter
Giovanni Antonio Lelli (1591–1640), Italian painter
Larry Lelli, American musician
Massimiliano Lelli (born 1967), Italian cyclist
Teodoro de Lellis or Teodoro Lelli (died 1466), Roman Catholic prelate who served as Bishop of Treviso

Italian-language surnames